"The One with Ross's Tan" is the third episode of Friends tenth season. It first aired on the NBC network in the United States on October 9, 2003.

Plot
After Ross sees Monica's tan, which Chandler reveals she got at a tanning salon, he decides to get a spray-on tan. After hearing seemingly straightforward instructions, he gets confused and accidentally gets a double dose on the front of his body and nothing on his back. Through a series of mishaps he gets more spray tan on his front until he is incredibly dark. A visit to another tanning salon does not help remedy the issue, as the experience is even more confusing and results in an octuple dose of spray tan only on the front, which Chandler takes a photo of after tricking him into opening the door.

During their first date as a couple, Rachel and Joey attempt to take their relationship to the next level but Rachel keeps accidentally slapping Joey, while Joey cannot get Rachel out of her clothes, unable to unhook her bra. After talking to Monica, who reminds her of when she first started going out with Ross and started moving past the awkwardness, Rachel decides she and Joey should power through. However, when she tries to have rough sex with him on the barcalounger, she accidentally knees him in the crotch, preventing him from performing. After talking to Chandler about their difficulties, they ask if things felt wrong when he and Monica first had sex; he affirms that they felt right and he felt it was meant to be. After reflecting on their friendship, Joey and Rachel concur their friendship is too strong for them to take things any further, and ultimately decide to stay friends.

Monica and Phoebe are annoyed when an obnoxious old friend from the building, Amanda Buffamonteezi (Jennifer Coolidge), moves back to New York from England and tries to make plans with them. They decide to "cut her" out, by ignoring her calls and dodging her until she leaves them alone. They first start out by not picking up the phone, which backfires when Chandler picks up the phone, resulting in Monica arranging a meeting at Central Perk. Once Amanda arrives there, she brings up memories of the time when Phoebe tried to "cut out" Monica many years before. Monica is mad at Phoebe, who reveals that it happened after they lived together: Monica was driving her crazy because of her shrillness and compulsiveness. However, Phoebe came to realize what a kind and generous person Monica is and is glad that she did not follow through with cutting her out. The two make up and decide to give Amanda another chance, but quickly leave when they see her giving Chandler a strange dance.

Reception
In the original broadcast, the episode was viewed by 21.87 million viewers. Sam Ashurst from Digital Spy ranked the episode #14 on their ranking of the 236 Friends episodes. Telegraph & Argus ranked the episode #19 on their ranking of all 236 Friends episodes.

References

2003 American television episodes
Friends (season 10) episodes